The  were a class of escort ships in the service of the Imperial Japanese Navy during World War II.  The Japanese called them "Type C" ocean defense ships, and they were the fifth class of Kaibōkan (Kai = sea, ocean, Bo = defense, Kan = ship), a name used to denote a multi-purpose vessel.

Background

On 22 April 1943, the Navy General Staff decided a mass production of escort ships, because of the urgent need to protect the convoys which were under constant attack. The plan was to build a basic escort ship of around 800 tons, with a simple design for easy construction. 
The first designs, for "Type A"  and "Type B" , still needed too many man-hours for building, so in June 1943, the Navy General Staff planned for a simplified design.

Design
Because of Japan's deteriorating war situation, the Type C was a further simplification of the Ukuru design. They were smaller by 200 tons and the diesel engines that propelled them were also smaller, at  versus  for the Ukurus. The number of  guns went from three to two. The number of depth charges aboard was the same, 120, but the number of depth charge throwers was decreased from 18 to 12 and the depth charge chutes were decreased from two to one.

Due to the simplifications of the design, a significant saving was made in construction time. The Type C escorts required approximately 20,000 man-hours each, compared to the 35,000 man-hours of the Ukurus and the 57,000 man-hours of the Mikuras.

Construction
The design work of the Type C ships started in March 1943, the same time as the Ukuru class. They were built concurrently with the Ukuru class and the Type D.  The Type C vessels were given odd numbers, while the Type D were given even numbers. The Type C were constructed using prefabricated sections that enabled them to be built in as little as three to four months. The lead ship, No.1 (CD-1) was constructed at Mitsubishi Heavy Industries, laid down on 15 September 1943, and completed with No.3 (CD-3) on 29 February 1944.

Service

The Type C escorts were assigned to the Destroyer Divisions and Escort Divisions for convoy escort operations. However, by 1944 the advantage had passed to the US, and many Type C vessels became casualties as the Japanese merchant fleet was devastated by the American submarine offensive. There were 53 finished during the war of the 300 planned, and several completed after World War II ended. 26 were sunk during the war.

Successes

 was sunk on 8 November 1944 by CD-19 with Mikura-class escort ship Chiburi and destroyer .
 was sunk on 28 March 1945 by CD-33 and CD-59 with Mikura.
 was sunk on 19 June 1945 by Type C vessels CD-63, CD-75 and CD-207 with Okinawa and CD-158.
 was rendered unfit for further service by damage from CD-33 and CD-29 with CD-22 on 30 October 1944.

Ships in class
Under the Wartime Naval Armaments Supplement Programme, it was proposed to build 300 Type C and 200 Type D escorts. These were assigned the Programme numbers #2401-#2700 for the Type C vessels, with #2701-#2900 for the Type D vessels. In view of the vast number intended, no names were allocated, but only numbers; odd numbers from No.1 upwards were assigned to Type C escorts, while even numbers from No.2 upwards were assigned to Type D escorts.

The first 132 of the Type C escorts were authorised under the 1943 Fiscal Year, but just 53 were completed and the others cancelled. The remaining 168 Type C vessels were authorised under the 1944 Fiscal Year, but no contracts were ever issued.

See also
Hiburi-class escort ship
Shimushu-class escort ship
Type D escort ship
Destroyer escort
Tacoma-class frigate
Flower-class corvette

Notes

References 

 Kaibokan combinedfleet.com (Retrieved 4 May 2009)
 C type escorts IJN
  (Retrieved 4 May 2009)
 US Submarine losses NavalHistory&Heritage  (Retrieved 4 May 2009)
 :ja:丙型海防艦
 Worth, Richard, Fleets of World War II, Da Capo Press (2001), 

Escort ship classes
 
Ships of the Republic of China Navy
Ships of the People's Liberation Army Navy